Primer Plano is a Venezuelan television talk show, aired on Radio Caracas Televisión (RCTV) and hosted by Marcel Granier, the current general director of RCTV and president of Empresas 1BC, the parent company of RCTV. The show debuted on 10 November 1976 with an interview of Diego Arria Salicetti, then governor of Caracas and has aired on-and-off since then. Primer Plano's most famous guest was Venezuelan president Hugo Chávez in 1998. Other important guest included Arturo Uslar Pietri, Henrique Salas Römer, Henrique Salas Feo, Irene Sáez, Valentina Quintero, and Andres Velázquez to name a few. The latest episode of Primer Plano took place on 30 November 2006 with an interview of Manuel Rosales, the current governor of Zulia and the then-opposition presidential candidate for the 2006 Venezuelan presidential elections.

References

External links
History of Primer Plano
Video gallery

1970s Venezuelan television series
1980s Venezuelan television series
1990s Venezuelan television series
2000s Venezuelan television series
2010s Venezuelan television series
1976 Venezuelan television series debuts
2006 Venezuelan television series endings
RCTV original programming
Venezuelan television news shows